Edward Thornton may refer to:

Edward Thornton (1766–1852), British Privy counsellor
Sir Edward Thornton (diplomat) (1817–1906), British Ambassador to Russia and Constantinople
Eddie Thornton (born 1932), Jamaican trumpeter
 (1811–1893), British administrator in India, who worked with Thomas Douglas Forsyth
Edward Thornton (politician), Canadian politician
Edward Thornton (cricketer) (1893–1970), English cricketer and military officer